Mobarakeh County is in Isfahan province, Iran. The capital of the county is the city of Mobarakeh. At the 2006 census, the county's population was 132,925 in 35,276 households. The following census in 2011 counted 143,474 people in 41,514 households."></ref>

Administrative divisions

The population history and structural changes of Mobarakeh County's administrative divisions over three consecutive censuses are shown in the following table. The latest census shows two districts, five rural districts, and six cities.

References

 

Counties of Isfahan Province